Sotogrande is the largest privately owned residential development in Andalusia, Spain. Originally a gated community, it is located in the municipality of San Roque and is composed of a 25-square-kilometre stretch from the Mediterranean Sea 25 km east of Gibraltar, back into the foothills of Sierra Almenara, providing contrasting views of sea, hills, cork forests and green fairways, including the Rock of Gibraltar and Morocco.

History
To build a city similar to Palm Springs in southern Europe, Sotogrande was developed by the industrialist couple from the Philippines, Joseph McMicking and Mercedes Zóbel, with support from their nephews Jaime Zóbel and Enrique Zóbel. The McMickings, having seen the idyllic coasts in 1962, acquired five neighboring farms with the idea of creating a luxurious residential development by the Mediterranean. In May 2006, Sotogrande was featured in The Times as having the most expensive homes in Europe. There are a number of artificial lakes and five golf courses, including the Valderrama Golf Club created by Jaime Ortiz-Patiño and the San Roque course. The port was established in 1988.

Architecture

Sotogrande is well known as an architectural showcase on the Costa del Sol, with styles varying from the traditional Andalusian to mid-century modern, to more modern and unusual designs, including moorish/mudéjar style homes and a Swiss chalet. In 2008, the local government declared three buildings as of cultural interest, protecting them from reform or demolition. These included the Biddle House by Francisco Javier Carvajal, the Zóbel house by José Antonio Coderch, and the Real Club de Golf by Luis Gutierrez Soto.

A specially built man-made lagoon is part of the newest developments in Sotogrande within the La Reserva gated residential community in the hills of Sotogrande.

Sport
Sotogrande has varied sporting facilities. It has five golf courses, including Valderrama Golf Club, which was host to the European Tour's Volvo Masters and the 1997 Ryder Cup. It also has two tennis and padel clubs, a rugby club, and two beach clubs, a kayak/sailing club, the famous Santa Maria Polo Club, riding stables, and a marina.

Nature
River Guadiaro and Estuary, Sotogrande, a natural area of 27 hectares and the only marshland on this part of the coast, has been designated as an Andalusian national park, wildlife and nature reserve. The reserve often hosts migratory birds on their route to and from Africa.

Economy
Sotogrande seems to have kept its head above the crisis. Finanzas, a Spanish finance publication, says that whilst prices in other areas of the Costa del Sol have taken a fall to the tune of -11.4% in Torremolinos, -10.99% in Fuengirola, -7.4% in Manilva, -5-5% in Casares and -3.4% in Mijas Costa. In Sotogrande average property prices have remained the same or increased, in some cases up to 45%. This phenomenon is attributed to the financial status of the residents of the urbanization.

Residents 
Some of the richest and most powerful families of Spain, Russia, and the United Kingdom reside in Sotogrande. Current and past regulars and inhabitants of Sotogrande include Peter Caruana, former Chief Minister of Gibraltar, Fabian Picardo, current Chief Minister of Gibraltar, Tony Blair, Emilio Botín, Ana Rosa Quintana, Royal Shakespeare Company actor Mike Gwilym, Vladimir Gusinsky, Boris Berezovsky, as well as Prince Louis Alphonse, Duke of Anjou, the legitimist pretender to the throne of France.

Scandal
Recorded by Spanish secret services, Vladimir Putin illegally entered Spain at Sotogrande by private boat via plane flights from London to Gibraltar several times while he was head of Russia's FSB during the 1990s.

Spanish police arrested several Russian mafia with residences at Sotogrande during Operation Troika.

References

External links
Sotogrande SA official website
Sotogrande Guide
San Roque, Cádiz
Populated places established in 1964
Resorts in Spain
Buildings and structures in Andalusia
Tourist attractions in Andalusia